Cerithium flemischi is a species of sea snail, a marine gastropod mollusk in the family Cerithiidae.

Description

Distribution
The distribution of Cerithium flemischi includes the Western Central Pacific.
 Philippines
 Mozambique Channel, Southern Africa

References

External links
 Martin K. (1933). Eine neue tertiäre Molluskenfauna aus dem Indischen Archipel. Leidsche Geologische Mededeelingen. 6(1): 7-32, 5 pls
 Houbrick R.S. (1992). Monograph of the genus Cerithium Bruguière in the Indo-Pacific (Cerithiidae: Prosobranchia). Smithsonian Contributions to Zoology. 510: 1-211

Cerithiidae
Gastropods described in 1933